Rudolf Zedi (born 31 August 1974 in Essen) is a German football manager and retired footballer.

References

External links 
Rudolf Zedi on Sport1.de
Rudolf Zedi on Fupa.net
 

1974 births
Living people
Footballers from Essen
German footballers
Association football midfielders
2. Bundesliga players
3. Liga players
Rot-Weiss Essen players
Fortuna Düsseldorf players
Chemnitzer FC players
FC Rot-Weiß Erfurt players
VfR Aalen players
Kickers Emden players
SC Paderborn 07 players